The Pauline Cheek Barton House is a historic house in Memphis, Tennessee. It was designed in the Colonial Revival style by architect Walk Claridge Jones, Sr., and built in 1937. It has been listed on the National Register of Historic Places since September 7, 1995.

References

National Register of Historic Places in Shelby County, Tennessee
Colonial Revival architecture in Tennessee
Houses completed in 1937
1937 establishments in Tennessee